Hebeloma leucosarx is a species of mushroom in the family Hymenogastraceae. H. leucosarx specimens are found across a wide spectrum of habitats, from dry to wet and from soil that is calcareous and humus-poor to acidic and humus-rich. They are most found under deciduous trees but can occasionally be spotted under coniferous trees.

References

leucosarx
Fungi of Europe